Ralph Burkei (15 December 1956, Munich – 26 November 2008) was a German TV producer and co-owner of the Bavarian production company C.A.M.P. TV. He was also active in Bavarian local politics with the Munich CSU party and was its treasurer from 2000 to 2004. At one time, he was vice-president of the TSV 1860 München and president of the VfB Leipzig football teams. Burkei died on the way to hospital after fleeing armed attackers and falling from the facade of the Taj Mahal hotel during the 2008 Mumbai attacks.

References

1956 births
2008 deaths
Television people from Munich
Christian Social Union in Bavaria politicians
German television producers
Victims of the 2008 Mumbai attacks
German terrorism victims
Deaths from falls
German people murdered abroad